Lucha Libre AAA: Héroes del Ring (formerly AAA El Videojuego or AAA The Videogame) is a lucha libre video game developed by Immersion Games for the PlayStation 3, Xbox 360. The video game features over 40 wrestlers from the Mexico based Lucha Libre AAA Worldwide (AAA) professional wrestling promotion. The game was released on October 12, 2010, exclusively in North America. Cancelled Nintendo DS, Wii, and PlayStation Portable versions were being developed by Sabarasa.

Reception

The PlayStation 3 version received "mixed" reviews, while the Xbox 360 version received "generally unfavorable reviews", according to video game review aggregator Metacritic. Despite some positive gameplay mechanics, good presentation and the inclusion of AAA legends, the game was criticised by reviewers for its slow gameplay and for being too similar to its WWE competitors.

See also

List of licensed wrestling video games
List of fighting games

References

2010 video games
Cancelled Nintendo DS games
Cancelled PlayStation Portable games
Cancelled Wii games
Konami games
Lucha libre
Lucha Libre AAA Worldwide
North America-exclusive video games
PlayStation 3 games
Professional wrestling games
Sega video games
Video games developed in Mexico
Video games set in Mexico
Xbox 360 games